Cedartown is an unincorporated community in Worcester County, Maryland, United States. Cedartown is located at the intersection of Cedartown and Basket Switch roads, northeast of Snow Hill.

References

Unincorporated communities in Worcester County, Maryland
Unincorporated communities in Maryland
Populated coastal places in Maryland